Shoreland is an unincorporated community located within Washington Township in Lucas County, Ohio along the Michigan-Ohio border. Shoreland is located East off I-75 and North of the Ottawa River. The Washington Township Fire department is located in Shoreland.  Shoreland Elementary School is an elementary school located in Shoreland which is part of Washington Local Schools.

Geography
 Shoreland is bordered by the city of Toledo from the west and the south.
 Shoreland is bordered by Erie Township, Michigan to the north.

Geographic features
 Shoreland is located on the shores of the upper banks of the Ottawa River.
 Shoreland is part of Northwest Ohio.
 Shoreland park is a small local park is located in Shoreland.

Major highways
  runs along the western boundary of the community.

References

Unincorporated communities in Lucas County, Ohio
Unincorporated communities in Ohio